Campile railway station served the village of Campile in County Wexford, Ireland.

The station opened on 1 August 1906 and closed on 18 September 2010. The rail service was replaced by a revised Bus Éireann route 370 from Monday 20 September 2010:

Routes

External links 
Irish Rail webpage for Campile station

See also 
 List of railway stations in Ireland

References 

Iarnród Éireann stations in County Wexford
Disused railway stations in County Wexford
Railway stations opened in 1906
1906 establishments in Ireland
Railway stations in the Republic of Ireland opened in the 20th century